Henry (Harry) Williams (10 November 1823 – 6 December 1907), farmer and politician, was the third son of the missionary Henry Williams and Marianne Williams. He married his cousin, Jane Elizabeth Williams, the daughter of William Williams and his wife Jane. He was their first child who was born in New Zealand.

He farmed at Pakaraka in the Bay of Islands. Williams was Chairman of the Bay of Islands County Council from 1876 to 1899.

Williams was a member of the New Zealand Legislative Council from 7 March 1882 to 27 June 1905, when he resigned.

References 

Members of the New Zealand Legislative Council
New Zealand farmers
Local politicians in New Zealand
People from the Bay of Islands
1823 births
1907 deaths
19th-century New Zealand politicians